Robert Young (1796–c.1813) was a Hawaiian chief and the son of John Young, the British advisor of Kamehameha the Great.

Early life
He was born February 14, 1796, the eldest son of John Young and his wife Namokuelua. Robert's mother, the chiefess Namokuelua, was of Oahuan aristocracy, although not of high rank. Even though he was his father's first son, Young was advanced in age, being over 48 while Robert's mother was 16 when he was born. Robert was the elder full brother of James Kanehoa Young, and he was elder half-brother of Fanny Kekelaokalani Young, Grace Kamaikui Young, John Kalaipaihala Young, and Jane Lahilahi Young, children of his father's second marriage to Kaoanaeha. He was one year older than James, 8 years older than Fanny, 10 years older than Grace, 14 years older than John and 17 years older than Jane.

Education
In 1802, Robert and probably James were both sent abroad to Boston, Massachusetts for a Western education. A letter in the Archives, dated in 1804, referring to Robert having been left at school in America, would indicate the event to have been an early politic step. It is dated at Canton, February 10, 1804, directed to John Young, and is as follows:
I have sent you by Mr. Davis 20 pieces of Blue Nankeens and two boxes of tea. I left your son Robert well in America about six months since; he is at school and behaves very well. I shall do everything for him that I promised you, you may depend on it. I am very fond of him, and shall take great care to make him a good man. Remember me to Stewart, Davis, and Holmes when you see them, and believe me,
Your friend,                JAMES MAGEE.

According to this letter, Robert could have only arrived in Boston, on October 1803. He made have started out from Hawaii in 1802, but the journey even by the standard of those days would not have taken more than 11 or 10 months.

Death
Robert joined the American Navy at age 16 and served in the War of 1812. Although he was half-British, he was captured by the British and taken prisoner in the Battle of Lake Champlain. He was sent to the island of Bermuda, where he became lost to history. Nothing definite was ever heard from him again. One source states: It is said that he died early in his school career and was buried in the States, but no particulars can be gathered.

See also
List of kidnappings
List of people who disappeared

Family tree

References

1796 births
1810s missing person cases
1813 deaths
American military personnel killed in the War of 1812
American military personnel of Native Hawaiian descent
Kidnapped American people
Military personnel missing in action
Missing person cases in North America
People from Hawaii (island)
Royalty of the Hawaiian Kingdom
United States Navy personnel of the War of 1812
War of 1812 prisoners of war held by the United Kingdom